Hypericum phellos is a species of shrub or small tree in Hypericum sect. Brathys. The species is found in Colombia and Venezuela on scrubby slopes and moist woods.

Description

The yellowish brown, four-lined stems are ancipitous when young and become terete. The sessile leaves spread from their base or are imbricate. The leaves are flat or recurved, never concave, and are thinly to thickly coriaceous. The apex of the leaf is acuminate to rounded and the base is cuneate to angusate. Leaves have three to seven diverging basal veins and obscure tertiary reticulation. The one to five flowered inflorescence is terminal, arising on short lateral shoots. The stigmas are small or subcapitate.

H. phellos is easily distinguished from close relatives by its corky ridges on its internodes and by its deciduous leaves. When leaves are persistent, they are either marcescent with an acute apex (var. marcescens), or broad and appressed, lacking corky emergences (subsp. platyphyllum). The other subspecies, oroqueanum, has appressed leaves that are not persistent.

Habitat and distribution

Hypericum phellos grows on scrubby slopes and in moist woodlands.

The shrub occurs in Santander, Norte de Santander, and Cesar in Colombia and in Táchira in Venezuela.

References

phellos
Plants described in 1929